Kurt Peter Larsen Danish author. Born 27.5 1953 in Denmark is the Danish half of the writing duo Oravsky/Larsen and writes in Danish, Swedish, English and German.
Kurt Peter Larsen and Vladimir Oravsky won the 2006 worldwide dramacompetition sponsored by The International Playwrights’ Forum, The International Theatre Institute (ITI) and The International Association of Theatre for Children and Young People (ASSITEJ) with their play ”AAAHR!!!”.

Select bibliography
 1989 - Herman och Tusse (Herman and Tofsy), co-author: V. Oravsky. .
 1989 - Herman och stjärnorna (Herman and the Stars), co-author: V. Oravsky. .
 1989 - Harry - en bussig buss (Harry, a Kind Bus), co-author: V. Oravsky. .
 2006 - Van Astrid tot Lindgren (From Astrid to Lindgren), co-author: V. Oravsky .
 2006 - Flykten under jorden jämte flera gruvsamma och nöjsamma tragedier och komedier (The Underground Escape and Other Underhanded and Undermining Tragedies and Comedies), co-author: V. Oravsky och Daniel Malmén. .
 2006 - ÄÄÄHR!!! (Aaahr!!!), co-author: V. Oravsky. .
 2007 - Axel och Toine (Axel and Toine), co-author: V. Oravsky, et al. .
 2007 - Från Astrid till Lindgren (From Astrid to Lindgren), co-author: V. Oravsky & Anonymous. .

Translations
 1993 - Sneglefart - og andre (Snailspeed and others), written by V. Oravsky..

Selected Drama
 1997 - Faust för tiden (Faust forever), (Danish, Swedish), co-author: V. Oravsky. 
 2002 - Astri mi! The Musical,  (English), co-author: V Oravsky.
 2005 - Spartacus uppäten (Spartacus devoured), (Danish, Swedish), co-author: V. Oravsky. 
 2006 - Antoinette, (English, Danish, Swedish), co-author: V. Oravsky.  
 2006 - AAAHR!!! (English, Danish, Swedish), co-author: V. Oravsky.
 2007 - En svensk tiger, Tiger Woods! (A Swede Is Silent, Tiger Woods), (Danish, Swedish), co-author: V. Oravsky.
 2007 - The Rocky Horror Prostata Show, Danish, Swedish), co-author: V. Oravsky.
 2007 - Astri mi! Pjäsen (Astri-mi! The Play) (English, Danish, Swedish), co-author: V. Oravsky.

1953 births
Living people
20th-century Danish dramatists and playwrights
21st-century Danish dramatists and playwrights

Danish male dramatists and playwrights